Ola Henmo (born 1965) is a Norwegian journalist and non-fiction writer.

Hailing from Grav in Bærum, he played football for the clubs Frigg, Fossum, Stabæk and then Fossum again.

He became a journalist working 15 years in Aftenposten. As a journalist he worked extensively with the 2011 Norway attacks, and was a consultant for the television series Utøya. He published a book for the 75th anniversary of the Norwegian Cancer Society (2013) and portrait books about activist Kim Friele (2015) and disabled politician Torstein Lerhol (2019), the latter two on the publishing house Cappelen Damm.

References

1965 births
Living people
Sportspeople from Bærum
Norwegian footballers
Frigg Oslo FK players
Fossum IF players
Stabæk Fotball players
Norwegian journalists
Aftenposten people
Norwegian non-fiction writers
Association footballers not categorized by position